Joseph Domnick Girardi  (January 14, 1943 – December 7, 1982) was an American football coach.  He was the head football coach at Baker University in Baldwin City, Kansas for four seasons, from 1976 until 1979.  His coaching record at Baker was 25–15–1.

Girardi died in a one-car accident on Interstate 40 near Winslow, Arizona in 1982.

Head coaching record

College

References

External links
 

1943 births
1982 deaths
Baker Wildcats football coaches
Southwestern Oklahoma State Bulldogs football coaches
High school football coaches in Arizona
High school football coaches in Kansas
People from New Kensington, Pennsylvania
Road incident deaths in Arizona